Philomena Bair (born 24 February 1996 in Hall in Tirol) is an Austrian freestyle skier. She competed at the 2014 Winter Olympics.

References

External link

1996 births
Living people
Austrian female freestyle skiers
Freestyle skiers at the 2014 Winter Olympics
Olympic freestyle skiers of Austria
People from Hall in Tirol
Sportspeople from Tyrol (state)
21st-century Austrian women